Yaneva is a surname. Notable people with the surname include:

Eva Yaneva (born 1985), Bulgarian volleyball player
Galina Yaneva (born 1959), Bulgarian gymnast
Yuliana Yaneva, Bulgarian wrestler
Zhana Yaneva (born 1990), Bulgarian model and beauty pageant titleholder